Klaus Bittermann (born 1952, Kulmbach, West Germany), also known under the pseudonym of Artur Cravan, is a German author and publisher.

Life
Bitterman, in the early 1970s, moved to Nuremberg to attend the University of Erlangen-Nuremberg, majoring in philosophy, sociology and political science. Even as a student he worked as a book producer.

Since 1979 he runs the publishing house Edition Tiamat, initially in Nuremberg, but from 1981 onward in Berlin. He also writes and is a satirist. Under the pseudonym "Artur Cravan" he wrote a Berlin thriller trilogy.

Bibliography
 Die Arbeit des Verdrängens. In: Die alte Straßenverkehrsordnung. Dokumente der RAF. Mit Beiträgen von , K. Hartung, K. Bittermann , Berlin 1986, S. 199-212.
 Das Sterben der Phantome. Verbrechen und Öffentlichkeit. Berlin 1988.
 als Herausgeber: Gemeinsam sind wir unausstehlich. Die Wiedervereinigung und ihre Folgen. Edition Tiamat, Berlin 1990,  (= Critica diabolis, Band 27).
 Geisterfahrer der Einheit. Kommentare zur Wiedervereinigungskrise. Berlin – Amsterdam 1995.
 Strandgut der Geschichte. München 2001, .
 Noch alle Schweine im Rennen? Mainz 2001, .
 In Schlucken-zwei-Spechte (Harry Rowohlt erzählt Ralf Sotscheck sein Leben von der Wiege bis zur Biege). Berlin 2002, .
 The Crazy Never Die. Amerikanische Rebellen in der populären Kultur. Berlin 2011, .
 als (Hrsg.): Das Wörterbuch des Gutmenschen. Betroffenheitsjargon und Gesinnungskitsch. München 1998, .
 als (Hrsg.): It's a Zoni. Zehn Jahre Wiedervereinigung. Die Ossis als Belastung und Belästigung. Berlin 2002, .
 als (Hrsg.): Literatur als Qual und Gequalle. Über den Kulturbetriebsintriganten Günter Grass. Berlin 2007, .
 Der Aufstand der Kuscheltiere. Haffmans Verlag bei zweitausendundeins, 2007, .
 als Hrsg.: Unter Zonis: Zwanzig Jahre reichen jetzt so langsam mal wieder. Ein Rückblick. Berlin 2009, .
 The Crazy Never Die. Amerikanische Rebellen in der populären Kultur. Edition Tiamat/Verlag Klaus Bittermann, Berlin 2011, .
 Möbel zu Hause, aber kein Geld für Alkohol. Kreuzberger Szenen. Edition Tiamat, Berlin 2011, .
 Alles schick in Kreuzberg: unter Touristen, Pennern, Gentrifzierten, Edition Tiamat, Berlin 2013,  (= Critica diabolis, Band 213 - fälschlicherweise als Band 212 der Schriftenreihe bezeichnet).

External links
Edition Tiamat's website

1952 births
German male writers
People from Kulmbach
Living people